The Uganda Civil Aviation Authority (UCAA) is the government agency responsible for licensing, monitoring, and regulating civil aviation matters. It is administered by the Uganda Ministry of Works and Transport.

Location
The coordinates of the CAA headquarters are 0°02'23.0"N, 32°26'53.0"E (Latitude:0.039722; Longitude:32.448056).

Overview
The agency was created by an Act of Parliament in 1994 as a state agency of the Ministry of Transport, Housing and Communication. As of October 2016, it was under the Ministry of Works and Transport.

The mandate of the UCAA is to coordinate and oversee Uganda's aviation industry, including licensing, regulation, air search and rescue, air traffic control, ownership of airports and aerodromes, and Ugandan and international aviation law. It also represents Uganda in an international capacity within the aviation community and in all other aviation matters. As of October 2016, the UCAA managed Entebbe International Airport and 13 other airports.

Organization and operations
, the CAA works with an administrative and operational structure of six directorates: (1) Directorate of Airports and Aviation Security (2) Directorate of Air Navigation Services (3) Directorate of Safety, Security & Economic Regulation (4) Directorate of Finance (5) Directorate of Human Resources & Administration (6) Directorate of Corporate Affairs

Expansion plans
In January 2015, Minister of Works and Transport Abraham Byandala unveiled a 20-year plan to increase international airports from one to five and regional airports from two to three; and improve six existing local airports. The plan also calls for the improvement of Entebbe International Airport at a cost of US$200 million. Another $200 million will be needed to complete the upgrades to the other airports.

Governance
The chairman of the board of directors is Justice Steven Kavuma. Other members of the board are listed below. The acting chief executive officer and Director General is Fred Bamwesigye. As of June 2020, the following are the members of the board of Uganda Civil Aviation Authority:

1. Justice Steven Kavuma: Chairman
2. Moses Paul Lubowa
3. Ethel Kamba
4. Dr Alayo Ocero
5. Thomas James Kiggundu
6. Mr. John Bulindi
7. Angela Kiryabwire Kanyima
8. Zubairi Musoke

Name change
In July 2019, the President of Uganda signed The CAA Amendment Act 2019. The Parliamentary Act changed the name of the agency to Uganda Civil Aviation Authority.

Recognition
In September 2019, UCAA was awarded an international aviation award in air safety following outstanding performance in the Universal Security Audit Programme, conducted in 2017, by the International Civil Aviation Organization (ICAO). Uganda scored 81.8 percent in the audit, compared with the global average of 73 percent and the African and Indian Ocean (APII) states average of 58 percent, according to ICAO.

In October 2019, the International Trade Council, recognized the Uganda Civil Aviation Authority with the Government Agency of the Year Going Global Award 2019, in the Aviation Category. The  award is in recognition of infrastructure improvement, staff training, customer care, support of tourism and facilitation of agricultural exports through Entebbe International Airport.

See also

Civil aviation authority
List of civil aviation authorities
Ugandan space initiatives

References

External links
Uganda Civil Aviation Authority Official Website
Behind Air Uganda Grounding
Uganda: Spending On Airports Not An Issue for Debate

Uganda
Government agencies of Uganda
Civil aviation in Uganda
Government agencies established in 1994
Organisations based in Entebbe
1994 establishments in Uganda
Air navigation service providers
Transport organisations based in Uganda